The Women in Print Conference (also the National Women in Print Conference) was a conference of feminist women involved in publishing, including workers from feminist bookstores, in the United States. It was conceptualized by June Arnold and involved networking and workshops. The conference was held three times: in 1976, 1981 and 1985.

Conferences 
The first Women in Print Conference was held at a Camp Fire Girls campsite in Omaha, Nebraska, in 1976, running from August 29 to September 5 with 132 women attending and representing 80 organizations. The preparation for it was initiated by novelist and publisher June Arnold, and the attendees came from across the United States. The location was chosen because it was near the center of the country. Feminist bookstore worker Carol Seajay attended the conference, and it inspired the creation of her trade publication Feminist Bookstore News.

The second Women in Print Conference was held in Washington, D.C., in 1981, and it ran from October 1 through October 4. At the conference, Barbara Smith announced the formation of Kitchen Table: Women of Color Press. While the first conference had included only white women, this one included about 25 women of color, who thus comprised approximately 10% of the more than 250 attendees. The conference schedule included nearly 60 workshops.

The third Women in Print Conference was held in San Francisco, California, in 1985, running from May 29 to June 1. It was scheduled to take place immediately after a nearby American Booksellers Association conference. About 200 women attended and discussed topics including censorship, working class issues, and lesbian erotica.

References 

Recurring events established in 1976
Conferences in the United States
Feminist events
Publishing in the United States
Recurring events disestablished in 1985
1976 in women's history
1981 in women's history
1985 in women's history
1976 in Nebraska
1981 in Washington, D.C.
1985 in San Francisco